is a Japanese manga series written and illustrated by Mitsuru Kido. It has been serialized in Shueisha's Jump Square magazine since October 2019, with its chapters collected into six tankōbon volumes as of October 2022. An anime television series adaptation by SynergySP is set to premiere in April 2023.

Premise
Liza Luna is an alien from the space empire Azatos, an advanced civilization with numerous planets under its control. As a member of the survey team, Liza comes to investigate Earth as a first step to its invasion. At first, she wanted to destroy Earth due to its civilization being at far lower level than hers, but begins to rethink her plan after stopping by a café and encounters a cat, a creature that is "too cute" and couldn't be found on any other planet in the universe.

Characters

The protagonist of the series, a girl form the space empire Azatos and a member of its Interstellar Survey Team, Liza wanted to destroy Earth due to its low level of civilization but came to investigate it regardless. On her first day on Earth, she visits a cat café and encounters a cat, a creature that is unknown to her. She is shocked by its "cuteness" and fainted. Afterwards, she deems the cuteness of cats and other animals to be dangerous and decides to settle on Earth in order to study them.

Liza's cat, a male American Curl who was found abandoned in the rain and taken in by Liza. Yozora was named for his yellow eyes and black body which resemble the stars in the night sky. He wants Liza to thoroughly pamper him due to his experience of being abandoned once.

A waitress working at Nyanday, a cat café where Liza visited when she first came to Earth. She teaches Liza about Earth and often accompanies her when she goes out. Later in the series, she gains the trust of the Interstellar Survey Team's members and is invited to visit their ship. Kasumi has a pet dog named Masamune, a Golden Retriever.

A clerk working at Nyanday who teaches Liza about cats when she first visited the café. Seiji is a cat person and owns a Maine Coon named Emily.

A member of the Interstellar Survey Team, Garumi and Rasta first met each other when they were younger and become roommates when they are staying on Earth. She could not compose herself when she sees cute animals but gradually improves after spending time on Earth. After seeing the relationship between Liza and Yozora, she decides to adopt a pet herself and receives a rabbit named Hinata from Melhelm, a rabbit café.

A member of the Interstellar Survey Team. He is allergic to cats and rabbits.

The vice-captain of the ship belonging to the Interstellar Survey Team. He and Liza have a siblings-like relationship since when they were young and has absolute trust in her. For a while, he thinks that cats are terrifying creatures based on the information he receives from Liza. After the misunderstanding is cleared up, he comes to like cat products which Liza brings back from Earth and decorates them in his room.

A member of the Interstellar Survey Team who serves as a director of communications, Fianna is a language specialist and was able to translate the languages of Earth in a week. Having been captivated by cats after seeing Yozora, she suggests the team to keep an animal from Earth on the ship and later receives a Pomeranian dog named Riku as a pet.

A junior high school student who is not afraid of aliens or space creatures. Her pet is a hedgehog named Negimaru.

Sasara's grandfather. He has a pet hamster named Mitsuro.

Media

Manga
Written and illustrated by Mitsuru Kido, Too Cute Crisis began serialization in Shueisha's Jump Square magazine on October 4, 2019. The first tankōbon volume was released on April 3, 2020. Four voiced comic videos were released on Jump Squares official YouTube channel between July and October 2021 to promote the series, featuring Yumiri Hanamori as Liza Luna. As of October 2022, six volumes have been released.

Volume list

Anime
An anime television series adaptation produced by SynergySP was announced on September 27, 2022. The series is directed by Jun Hatori, with scripts written by Aya Satsuki, character designs handled by Mayumi Watanabe, music composed by Shun Narita and Yūsuke Seo, and Yumiri Hanamori respiring her role as Liza Luna. It is set to premiere on April 7, 2023, on Tokyo MX and other networks. Sentai Filmworks licensed the series, and will be streaming it on Hidive.

References

External links
  
  
 

2023 anime television series debuts
Anime series based on manga
Comedy anime and manga
Comics about cats
Extraterrestrials in anime and manga
Science fiction anime and manga
Sentai Filmworks
Shōnen manga
Shueisha manga
Upcoming anime television series
Tokyo MX original programming